The 2022 Orange County Board of Supervisors elections were held on June 7 and November 8, 2022. Three of the five seats of the Orange County, California Board of Supervisors were up for election. This was the first set of elections held after the 2020 redistricting cycle. County elections in California are officially nonpartisan. A two-round system was used for the election, starting with the first round in June. Runoffs were held in all three districts, as no candidate managed to reach the 50% + 1 threshold.

Preceding the election, the Republican Party held three seats on the board, while the Democratic Party held two. One Republican-held district, the 5th, and two Democratic-held districts, the 2nd and 4th, were up for election in 2022. In the 2nd and 4th districts, both candidates who advanced from the jungle primary were Democrats, guaranteeing that the Democratic Party will hold those seats. In the 5th district, one Republican and one Democrat advanced, meaning that control of the entire board rested on the outcome of the general election in that district. After the election Democrats flipped the 5th district, taking control of the board for the first time in over 40 years.

Key issues in the 2022 election included the COVID-19 pandemic, especially the board's role in enforcing mask and vaccine mandates, and how to prioritize spending between law enforcement and other public services.

District 2

The 2nd district includes Santa Ana as well as parts of Anaheim, Garden Grove, Orange, and Tustin. Due to changes in redistricting, this is the county's first ever majority-Latino district. Incumbent supervisor Katrina Foley chose to seek re-election in the 5th district, making this an open seat.

Candidates
Note: County elections in California are officially nonpartisan. The parties below identify which party label each candidate would have run under if given the option.

Kim Bernice Nguyen (Democratic), Garden Grove city councilor
Jon Dumitru (Republican), Orange city councilor
Cecilia Iglesias (Republican), former Santa Ana city councilor
Vicente Sarmiento (Democratic), mayor of Santa Ana
Juan Villegas (No party preference), former Santa Ana city councilor

General election

Runoff

District 4

The 4th district includes Brea, Buena Park, Fullerton, La Habra, Placentia, Stanton, and parts of Anaheim. The incumbent is Democrat Doug Chaffee, who was elected with 50.4% of the vote in 2018. Chaffee faced criticism within his own party for some of his votes and actions in office, and the Orange County Democratic Party endorsed his challenger Sunny Park.

Candidates
Note: County elections in California are officially nonpartisan. The parties below identify which party label each candidate would have run under if given the option.

Doug Chaffee (Democratic), incumbent supervisor
Sunny Park (Democratic), mayor of Buena Park
Steve Vargas (Republican), Brea city councilor

General election

Runoff

District 5

The 5th district is largely coastal and includes Aliso Viejo, Costa Mesa, Dana Point, Laguna Beach, Laguna Hills, Laguna Niguel, Laguna Woods, Newport Beach, San Clemente, San Juan Capistrano, several unincorporated communities, and the southern portion of Irvine. The incumbent is Republican Lisa Bartlett, who is term-limited and cannot seek re-election, and instead ran for U.S. House. Democratic 2nd district incumbent Katrina Foley switched to run in this district. Foley was elected with 43.4% of the vote in a 2021 special election.

Candidates
Note: County elections in California are officially nonpartisan. The parties below identify which party label each candidate would have run under if given the option.

Patricia Bates (Republican), state senator, former minority leader of the California Senate, and former Orange County supervisor
Katrina Foley (Democratic), incumbent 2nd district supervisor
Diane Harkey (Republican), former member of the California State Board of Equalization and runner-up for California's 49th congressional district in 2018
Kevin Muldoon (Republican), mayor of Newport Beach

Endorsements

General election

Runoff

References

Orange County Board of Supervisors
Orange County Board of Supervisors 2022
Orange County Board of Supervisors